Saint James Intercisus, also called James the Mutilated or James the Persian (Syriac: Mor Yakob M'phasko Sahada; Latin: Sanctus Jacobus Intercisus), (died in 420 AD) was a Syriac Christian saint born in Beth Huzaye (Syriac: ܒܝܬ ܗܘܙܝܐ) in Persia. His epithet, Intercisus, is derived from the Latin word for "cut into pieces," which refers to the manner of his martyrdom: he was slowly cut into twenty-eight pieces. His death, along with the persecution of other Christians in the Sasanid Empire, started the Roman-Sassanid War (421-422).

His feast day is November 27.

Life 
Tradition states that he was a military officer and courtier to Yazdegerd I who had apostatized after this ruler began to persecute Christians. Under the influence of his Christian family, however, he expressed his faith to Yazdegerd's successor, Bahram V, leading to his execution.

Death 
He was killed in Beth Lapat (Gundishapur). The ruins of this city are near Dezful, Iran.

At his execution, he survived the loss of limbs until he was beheaded. His followers requested his body parts as relics, but this request was denied, so they stole the body parts, which were somehow sent to the Portuguese cathedral of Braga and put into a sarcophagus in the Relics Chapel.

Legend 
James' story is recounted in The Golden Legend.

According to Katherine Rabenstein, he may be a composite character of James of Beit (who, having renounced Christianity under Yazdegerd, was shamed by his parents and changed his mind, becoming a martyr under the persecution of Bahram); Mar Peros (similarly shamed by his parents and martyred in 448); and James of Karka (a 20-year-old notary to Bahram, tortured alongside many others after casually remarking that he'd rather be cut into pieces than renounce God).

Holy Relics, Churches and Monasteries 
Guillermus Ludovicus, bishop of Salpi, gifted to the abbey of St Paul in Cormery, the place where he had been a monk, several relics, including the head of St James, on July 19th 1103.

A piece of bone from the finger of St. James the Mutilated (Mor Yakob M'phasko Sahada) is kept in a golden casket in the holy cross (kurishupalli) dedicated to the saint in the Orthodox Syrian Old Church of St Peter & Paul in Pengamuck, Kerala, India. It was dedicated by Mor Gregorios Geevargese (Parumala Thirumeni)] and metropolitan Mor Dionysious Joseph (Pulikkottil II), a native of Pengamuck, who had received the bone at his consecration as Metropolitan by the patriarch of Antioch Ignatius Yakoob II.

Several churches and monasteries are dedicated to St. James:
Church of St. James Intercisus in the Armenian Quarter of Jerusalem
Monastery of St. James the Persian in Sireți, Strășeni Moldova
Monastery of St. James the Persian in Deddeh, Lebanon
Monastery of St James the Mutilated in Qara, Syria

References

External links
 San Giacomo l'Interciso (il Solitario) Martire in Persia
The Holy Martyr James the Persian 
 Monastery of St. Jacob Persian
 Saint of the Day: November 27th - Saint James Intercisus (Butler's Lives of the Saints)

Bibliography 
Thieleman J. van Braght, Martyr's Mirror, 1660

Persian saints
421 deaths
5th-century Christian saints
5th-century Iranian people
Year of birth unknown
People executed by the Sasanian Empire
Christians in the Sasanian Empire
Converts to Zoroastrianism from Christianity
Converts to Christianity from Zoroastrianism